Centralny (Novy) Bridge is a bridge over river Dnipro in the city of Dnipro, Ukraine connecting right and left banks of Dnipro and is a continuation of Slobozhanskyi prospekt that stretches over to the Dnipro city centre. Built in 1966, the bridge was originally named as the 50th Anniversary of the Great October.

The bridge is also known as Novyi (New) bridge, a name which it received as becoming an alternative crossing to the older Amursky Bridge located not far up the stream. At the left bank of Dnipro, the bridge travels between neighborhood Sonyachny and city park Sahaidak. Entering the city center on the right bank, the bridge transitions into a city street, vulystia Kotsiubynskoho.

See also
 Bridges in Dnipro

References

External links
 General contractor will be held responsible for failure to meet project deadlines of the New Bridge (Генпідрядник відповість за зрив строків здачі Нового мосту). Nashe Misto (Dnipro city newspaper). 28 November 2017
 The estimate of the Tsentralny Bridge capital repair in Dnipro already reached quarter of billion hryvnia (Кошторис капремонту Центрального мосту у Дніпрі сягнув вже чверть мільярда гривень). Glavcom. 11 August 2017
 In Dnipro authorities review a substitution of general contractor for the New Bridge repairs (У Дніпрі влада розглядає зміну підрядника для ремонту Нового мосту). Ukrinform. 9 February 2018

Road bridges in Dnipro
Bridges over the Dnieper
Bridges completed in 1966
1966 establishments in Ukraine